The legislative districts of Davao City are the representations of the highly urbanized city of Davao in the various national legislatures of the Philippines. The city is currently represented in the lower house of the Congress of the Philippines through its first, second, and third congressional districts.

History 

Except during the Second World War, areas now under the jurisdiction of Davao City were previously represented as part of the Department of Mindanao and Sulu (1917–1935), the historical Davao Province (1935–1967), Davao del Sur (1967–1972) and Region XI (1978–1984).

Being a chartered city, two delegates represented Davao City in the National Assembly of the Japanese-sponsored Second Philippine Republic: one was the city mayor (an ex officio member), while the other was elected through an assembly of KALIBAPI members within the city during the Japanese occupation of the Philippines. After the war Davao City reverted to its pre-war representation under the province of Davao, which lasted until 1967.

The enactment of Republic Act No. 4867 on May 8, 1967 split the old Davao Province into the new provinces of Davao del Norte, Davao del Sur and Davao Oriental, and provided each of them with separate representation. Per Section 5 of R.A. 4867, Davao City was grouped with Davao del Sur for the purposes of electing members of Congress; this was the arrangement from the second half of the 6th Congress until the end of the 7th Congress. The city was also represented in the Interim Batasang Pambansa as part of Region XI from 1978 to 1984.

By virtue of having been classified as a highly urbanized city on December 22, 1979 through Batas Pambansa Blg. 51, Davao City regained separate representation in the succeeding Regular Batasang Pambansa, electing two representatives, at-large, in 1984.

Under the new Constitution which was proclaimed on February 11, 1987, the city was reapportioned into three congressional districts; each district elected its member to the restored House of Representatives starting that same year.

Current districts 
The city was last apportioned upon the proclamation of the 1987 Constitution, where it was granted three seats in Congress. The city's current congressional delegation composes of two members of Lakas-CMD and one member of National Unity Party. All three representatives are members of the Hugpong ng Pagbabago local party and part of the majority bloc in the 19th Congress.

At-Large (defunct)

1943-1944

1984-1986

See also 
Legislative district of Mindanao and Sulu
Legislative district of Davao
Legislative district of Davao del Sur

References

Davao City
Politics of Davao City